Phrynocephalus is a genus which includes 33 species of small and medium-sized agamid lizards, commonly called toadhead agamas or toad-headed agamas, that inhabit open arid and semiarid environments of Asia and Eastern Europe. The systematics of this genus are very complicated with many controversial points of view about the unclear phylogeny of this group. All representatives of this genus have adopted the so-called "sit and wait" hunting strategy and they actively use visual orientation when watching for food. In general, the ecological niche and role of Phrynocephalus species in lizard communities of arid environments of Asia are poorly studied, but seem to be similar to that of Phrynosoma, Cophosaurus, Holbrookia, Uta, and Sceloporus in the New World, as well as Moloch in Australia.

Species
The following 34 species are recognized as being valid.
Phrynocephalus ananjevae  – Natalie's toadhead agama
Phrynocephalus arabicus  – Arabian toadhead agama
Phrynocephalus axillaris  – Yarkand toadhead agama
Phrynocephalus clarkorum  – Afghan toadhead agama
Phrynocephalus erythrurus  – Sagus Kul lizard
Phrynocephalus euptilopus  – Alcock's toadhead agama
Phrynocephalus forsythii  – Forsyth's toadhead agama
Phrynocephalus frontalis  – Shansi toadhead agama
Phrynocephalus golubewii 
Phrynocephalus guttatus  – spotted toadhead agama
Phrynocephalus helioscopus  – sunwatcher toadhead agama
Phrynocephalus hispidus  – Dzhungar variegated toadhead agama
Phrynocephalus horvathi  – Horvath's toadhead agama
Phrynocephalus interscapularis – Lichtenstein's toadhead agama
Phrynocephalus kulagini  – Kulagin’s variegated toadhead agama
Phrynocephalus lutensis  – Lut Desert toadhead agama
Phrynocephalus luteoguttatus  – yellow-speckled toadhead agama
Phrynocephalus maculatus  – blacktail toadhead agama
Phrynocephalus mystaceus  – secret toadhead agama

Phrynocephalus ornatus  
Phrynocephalus persicus  – Persian toadhead agama
Phrynocephalus przewalskii  – Przewalski's toadhead agama
Phrynocephalus putjatai 
Phrynocephalus raddei 
Phrynocephalus reticulatus  – reticulated toadhead agama
Phrynocephalus roborowskii  – Roborowski's toadhead agama
Phrynocephalus rossikowi  – Uzbekistan toadhead agama
Phrynocephalus sakoi 
Phrynocephalus scutellatus  – gray toadhead agama
Phrynocephalus strauchi  – Strauch's toadhead agama
Phrynocephalus theobaldi  – Theobald's toadhead agama, toad-headed lizard, or snow lizard
Phrynocephalus versicolor  – Tuvan toadhead agama
Phrynocephalus vindumi  
Phrynocephalus vlangalii  – Ching Hai toadhead agama

Nota bene: A binomial authority in parentheses indicates that the species was originally described in a genus other than Phrynocephalus.

References

Further reading
"Caup [= Kaup JJ]" (1825). "Einige Bemerkungen zu Merrems Handbuch [= Some Remarks on Merrem's Handbook]". Isis von Oken 16: 589-593. (Phrynocephalus, new genus, p. 591). (in German).

 
Lizard genera
Taxa named by Johann Jakob Kaup